Chloromyia speciosa, is a European species of soldier fly.

References

Stratiomyidae
Diptera of Europe
Insects described in 1834
Taxa named by Pierre-Justin-Marie Macquart